This is the discography of Terry Hall (born Terence Edward Hall; 19 March 1959 in Coventry, England – 18 December 2022) who was the lead singer of the Specials, and formerly of Fun Boy Three, the Colourfield, Terry, Blair & Anouchka and Vegas. He released his first solo album, Home, in 1994.

Studio albums
Below is a list of all the studio albums Hall has been involved with.

Compilation albums
Three compilation albums have been released that chronicle Hall's career through the different groups and solo work he has produced.

 The Collection (Chrysalis, 1992)
 Through the Years (EMI, 2001)
 The Complete Terry Hall (EMI Gold, 2001)

Singles
Below is a list of all the singles Hall has been involved with.

Contributions
 1992 – Co-wrote "Sense", "Where Flowers Fade" and "A Small Slice of Heaven" with The Lightning Seeds from Sense.
 1994 – Co-wrote "Lucky You" with The Lightning Seeds from Jollification.
1995 – "Dream a Little Dream" with Salad from Help: A Charity Project for the Children of Bosnia
 1996 – "Poems" with Tricky and Martina Topley-Bird from Nearly God. "Bubbles" with Tricky
 1996 – Co-wrote "Imaginary Friends", "What If..." and "Like You Do" with The Lightning Seeds from Dizzy Heights.
 1999 – Co-wrote "I Wish I Was in Love" with The Lightning Seeds and Peter Green from Tilt.
 2008 – Co-wrote and provided vocals on "Time To Blow" and "Why Should I?" on Leila's album Blood, Looms and Blooms
 2009 – Featured Artist on "Was It Worth It?" from Shakespears Sister available on the album Songs from the Red Room

See also
The Specials discography
Fun Boy Three discography
The Colourfield discography

References

Discographies of British artists
Pop music discographies